The Tabloid Blues (aka Dan Kelly and the Alpha Males sing the Tabloid Blues) is the debut album by Australian act Dan Kelly & The Alpha Males.

The album was released on 15 March 2004 on In-Fidelity Records and distributed by Shock Records.

Track listing
All tracks written by Dan Kelly, except where noted.

 "Checkout Cutie" (Dan Kelly, S. Jones) – 2:24
 "Step Forward" – 3:49
 "Bunk Lovin' Man" – 4:17
 "All On My Lonesome" – 4:33
 "Summer Wino" – 4:54
 "Human Sea" – 3:07
 "Lutheran Hall" – 4:29
 "Get High On Yr Own Supply" – 3:49
 "The Tabloid Blues" – 4:45
 "Pregnant Conversation" – 3:16
 "A Town Called Sadness" – 4:25
 "River O Tears" (Dan Kelly, Gareth Liddiard) – 4:22

Personnel
 Dan Kelly – Guitar, vocals
 Gareth Liddiard – Bass, Vocals
 Tom Carlyon – Guitar, keyboards
 Christian Strybosch – drums

References

2004 debut albums
Dan Kelly and the Alpha Males albums